The following lists events that happened during 1967 in New Zealand.

Population
 Estimated population as of 31 December: 2,745,000
 Increase since 31 December 1966: 33,700 (1.24%)
 Males per 100 females: 100.2

Incumbents

Regal and viceregal
Head of State – Elizabeth II
Governor-General – Brigadier Sir Bernard Fergusson GCMG GCVO DSO OBE, followed by Sir Arthur Porritt Bt GCMG GCVO CBE.

Government
The 35th Parliament of New Zealand commenced, with the second National government in power.
Speaker of the House – Roy Jack.
Prime Minister – Keith Holyoake
Deputy Prime Minister – Jack Marshall.
Minister of Finance – Harry Lake until 21 February (death), then Robert Muldoon.
Minister of Foreign Affairs – Keith Holyoake.
Attorney-General – Ralph Hanan.
Chief Justice — Sir Richard Wild

Parliamentary opposition 
 Leader of the Opposition –   Norman Kirk (Labour).
 Leader of the Social Credit Party – Vernon Cracknell

Main centre leaders
Mayor of Auckland – Roy McElroy
Mayor of Hamilton – Denis Rogers
Mayor of Wellington – Frank Kitts
Mayor of Christchurch – George Manning
Mayor of Dunedin – Russell John Calvert

Events 

 19 January – A gas explosion in the Strongman coal mine near Greymouth kills 19 miners.
 23-26 January – The Prime Minister of South Vietnam, Air Marshall Nguyễn Cao Kỳ, tours New Zealand.
 February – Free milk in schools (a half pint daily for each primary school pupil) was stopped, it had been distributed since 1937. Some schools continued it with parents paying.
 11 March – 1967 Southern Maori by-election: Whetu Tirikatene (Labour) wins the by-election, replacing her late father, Eruera Tirikatene (Labour).
 19 March – Two tigers are shot dead in Newtown after escaping an insecure enclosure at Wellington Zoo.
 15 April
 1967 Fendalton by-election: Eric Holland (National) wins the by-election, replacing the late Harry Lake (National).
 1967 Petone by-election: Fraser Colman (Labour) wins the by-election, replacing the late Mick Moohan (Labour).
7-17 May – Railway workers strike after failed wage talks with the government, cancelling rail services nationwide for eleven days.
10 July – The nation's currency is decimalised, with the New Zealand dollar replacing the New Zealand pound at a rate of two dollars to a pound.
23 September – Referendums were held on whether to extend hotel closing hours (passed), and whether to extend the term of Parliament (failed; see referendum).
 9 October – Three weeks after the referendum, bar closing times were extended to 10pm; ending the six o'clock swill.
 December – The report of the Royal Commission on Compensation for Personal Injury in New Zealand (the "Woodhouse Report") is released, recommending the establishment of a universal no-fault compensation scheme for injuries. The scheme was later realised in 1974 as the Accident Compensation Commission (ACC).

Arts and literature
James K. Baxter wins the Robert Burns Fellowship. 

See 1967 in art, 1967 in literature, :Category:1967 books

Music

New Zealand Music Awards
Loxene Golden Disc  Lee Grant – Thanks To You

See: 1967 in music

Radio and television

See: 1967 in New Zealand television, 1967 in television, List of TVNZ television programming, :Category:Television in New Zealand, :Category:New Zealand television shows, Public broadcasting in New Zealand

Film

See: :Category:1967 film awards, 1967 in film, List of New Zealand feature films, Cinema of New Zealand, :Category:1967 films

Sport

Athletics
David McKenzie wins his second national title in the men's marathon, clocking 2:21:50 in Lower Hutt.

Chess
 The 74th National Chess Championship was held in Christchurch, and was won by Ortvin Sarapu of Auckland (his 9th title).

Horse racing

Harness racing
 New Zealand Trotting Cup: Great Adios
 Auckland Trotting Cup: Allakasam

Soccer
 The Chatham Cup is won by North Shore United who beat Christchurch City 2–1 in the final.
 Northern League champions: Ponsonby AFC
 Disagreement over the inclusion of a Gisborne team in the Western League caused its dissolution and the establishment of a Central Districts League, with Wanganui omitted but Poverty Bay and Wairarapa included. The premier division was won by Eastern Union
 Provincial league champions:
	Canterbury:	Christchurch City
	Marlborough:	Grosvenor Rovers
	Nelson:	Thistle
	Otago:	Northern AFC
	South Canterbury:	West End
	Southland:	Invercargill United
	Wanganui:	Wanganui Athletic
	Wellington:	Hungaria
	West Coast:	  no competition

Births
 6 January: Craig Perks, golfer.
 17 March: Andrew Bird, rowing cox.
 27 March: Anthony Thornton, field hockey player.
 7 April: Scott Hobson, field hockey player.
 17 April: Ian Jones, rugby player.
 5 May: Paul Martin SM (born 5 May 1967) (Bishop-elect) appointed in December 2017 as the 10th Bishop of Christchurch. 10 May: Eion Crossan, rugby player
 23 May: Craig Monk, yachtsman.
 31 May:  Phil Keoghan, television presenter.
 11 June: Graeme Bachop, rugby player
 15 June: Paul Kingsman, swimmer.
 12 July: Anthony Beks, swimmer.
 1 August: Cameron Rhodes, actor.
 20 August Robert Ironside soccer
 30 August (in England): Justin Vaughan, cricketer.
 4 September: Darrin Murray, cricketer.
 18 September (in England): Gary Anderson, cyclist.
 21 October: Gavin Lovegrove, javelin thrower.
 26 October: Keith Urban, country singer.
 Bernard Beckett, writer.
 Niki Caro, filmmaker.
 Megan Gay, actress.
 Katherine Rich, politician.
:Category:1967 births

Deaths
 11 January: Sir Eruera Tirikatene, politician 
 17 January: George Yerex, wildlife conservator
 4 February: James Roberts trade unionist, former president of Labour Party
 21 February: Harry Lake, politician, minister of finance 
 7 April: Louis Daly Irving Austin, pianist, music teacher, conductor, composer and critical gadfly
 23 May: Robert Macalister, Mayor of Wellington.
 25 September: P. H. Matthews, politician
 22 October: Leonard Morton Wright, Mayor of Dunedin
 3 November: Alexander Aitken, mathematician
 December: Edwin Thoms Cox (in Adelaide), Mayor of Dunedin
 Rehutai Maihi, tribal leader, journalist, newspaper publisher and editor, political candidate and community leader
:Category:1967 deaths

See also
List of years in New Zealand
Timeline of New Zealand history
History of New Zealand
Military history of New Zealand
Timeline of the New Zealand environment
Timeline of New Zealand's links with AntarcticaFor world events and topics in 1967 not specifically related to New Zealand see'': 1967

References

External links

 
New Zealand
Years of the 20th century in New Zealand